This is an incomplete list of New York State Historic Markers in Wayne County, New York.

Listings county-wide

Pultneyville, Hamlet of 

FIRST WHITE MEN
Location: The intersection of Washington & Mill Streets.
Inscription: First White Men. From 1687 French Batteaux men stopped here to trade with Indians. First settler "Yankee Bill" Waters, a hunter lived here 1804.
Erected by: State Education Department 1935
GPS Coord:  (43.279, -76.186)

See also
List of New York State Historic Markers
National Register of Historic Places listings in New York
List of National Historic Landmarks in New York

References

Wayne County, New York
Wayne